Striophytoecia mirei is a species of longhorn beetle in the subfamily Lamiinae, and the only species in the genus Striophytoecia. It was described by Stephan von Breuning in 1969.

References

Saperdini
Beetles described in 1969